"24 Hours" is the solo debut single by South Korean singer Sunmi. It was released by JYP Entertainment on August 26, 2013. It was included in Sunmi's debut EP Full Moon which was released six months later.

Background
The song marks "the very first project in 13 years that J. Y. Park went all in on, since Park Ji-yoon's "Coming-of-Age Ceremony." He wrote and composed the song while also overseeing the dance, the music video and the choreography.

Composition
The song is described as "a hard-hitting pop track enhanced with a tango-inspired section."

Music video
The music video, directed by Naive Creative Production, was released on August 20, 2013, six days before the single's release. As of July 2020, it has over 13.5 million views on YouTube.

Credits and personnel
Credits adapted from liner notes from Full Moon. Recorded at JYPE Studios.

 Sunmi – vocals, background vocals
 J. Y. Park — songwriting, composing, producing, arrangement, all instruments, background vocals
 Hong Ji-sang — arrangement, all instruments, programming
 Kim Yong-woon — recording
 Lee Jae-won — recording
 Phil Tan — mixing
 Daniela Rivera — mixing
 Geoff Pesche — mastering

Usage in media
The fourteenth episode of the YouTube Premium series Top Management was named after the song.

Charts

Weekly charts

Monthly charts

Year-end charts

Awards and nominations

Release history

References

Korean-language songs
2013 singles
2013 songs
Songs written by Park Jin-young
Dance-pop songs
JYP Entertainment singles
Sunmi songs